Kofi Asamoah also known as Kofas is a Ghanaian award-winning film director, writer, and film producer. He is the CEO and Creative Director of Kofas Media, a film, television and advertising production company.

Early life 
Kofi was born in Assin Anyinabrem in Ghana's Central region but grew up mostly in Takoradi in the Western Region of Ghana where he had his basic and primary education at the Young Christian Preparatory School.  He had his secondary education at Mfantsipim School, where he was a member of the school's national debating team. Kofi Asamoah started his tertiary education at the University of Ghana, Legon. As his career in Filmmaking got started, he proceeded to the National Film and Television Institute (NAFTI), where he graduated with a bachelor's degree in Film and Television Production with a major in Film Directing. Asamoah then joined Ghana Institute of Journalism where he attained a master's degree in Public Relations. He later moved to the US where he studied Filmmaking at the New York Film Academy.

Career 

Kofi started out professionally as a news reporter with Skyy Power FM/TV, where he became the voice of their reality show. In 2009, he ventured into film making in Kumasi. He scripted and produced his first content in 2012 titled "Boys Kasa"  (comic series) featuring Kalybos eventually shot him into the Ghanaian movie industry.

Asamoah has produced and directed several Ghanaian films such as Area Boys (2011), Kalybos in China (2015), John and John (2017), Amakye and Dede, a 2016 film that featured Majid Michel, John Dumelo and Salma Mumin and won Best Movie of the Year Award (Ghana) at City People Entertainment Awards 2016.

He won Best Movie Director at the 2016 City People Entertainment Awards.

Filmography

TV Series 
Eye Red
Noko Fio
Pa2Pa
Papa Kumasi
Bombo Clinic
Cow and Chicken
Guy Guy (director) 
Cocoa Brown

Awards and nominations

References 

1987 births
Living people
Ghanaian film directors
Ghanaian film producers
Ghanaian screenwriters